Hungary is a unitary parliamentary republic in Central Europe. With about 10 million inhabitants, Hungary is a medium-sized member state of the European Union. The official language is Hungarian, which is the most widely spoken non-Indo-European language in Europe. Hungary's capital and largest metropolis is Budapest, a significant economic hub, classified as an Alpha- global city. Major urban areas include Debrecen, Szeged, Miskolc, Pécs and Győr.

Hungary is a middle power and has the world's 57th largest economy by nominal GDP, as well as the 58th largest by PPP, out of 188 countries measured by the IMF. As a substantial actor in several industrial and technological sectors, it is both the world's 36th largest exporter and importer of goods. Hungary is a high-income economy with a very high standard of living. It keeps up a social security and universal health care system, and a tuition-free university education.

For further information on the types of business entities in this country and their abbreviations, see "Business entities in Hungary".

Notable firms 
This list includes notable companies with primary headquarters located in the country. The industry and sector follow the Industry Classification Benchmark taxonomy. Organizations which have ceased operations are included and noted as defunct.

See also 
 List of Hungarians by net worth
 Economy of Hungary
 List of airlines of Hungary
 List of restaurants in Hungary
 List of supermarket chains in Hungary
 Media in Hungary
 Telecommunications in Hungary

References 

 
Hungary